Walter Eric Barnard (9 October 1898 – 1982) was an English professional footballer who played in the Football League for Gillingham as a right back.

Career statistics

References

1898 births
English footballers
Footballers from Tottenham
Gillingham F.C. players
Tottenham Hotspur F.C. players
Brentford F.C. players
1982 deaths
Association football fullbacks
Clapton F.C. players
Isthmian League players